Samuel Fabris (born 30 January 1991) is a Belgian professional footballer who plays for Virton in the Belgian Second Division, as a midfielder.

Career
Fabris made his senior debut for Charleroi in the 2008-09 season.

References

External links
 Samuel Fabris at Footballdatabase
 Samuel Fabris at Soccerway

1991 births
Living people
Belgian footballers
R. Charleroi S.C. players
RWS Bruxelles players
Belgian Pro League players
Challenger Pro League players
Association football midfielders